Southport Corporation Tramways operated a tramway service in Southport between 1900 and 1934.

History

In 1896, Southport Corporation purchased the Birkdale and Southport Tramways Company which had operated horse-drawn tramways since 1873. The tracks within its boundary was also purchased, with that in Birkdale being purchased by that Council

In 1899 Southport Corporation obtained permission to electrify and extend the tramways within its boundaries. Work moved quickly and on 18 July 1900, three routes opened in Southport and electric cars ran. By the end of the year the number of routes had increased to seven, a compact maze of routes serving Smedley, Birkdale, Bedford Park, Kew Gardens, Blowick, Crowlands, High Park and Churchtown.

The depot was in Canning Road, Blowick.

In 1912 Southport absorbed Birkdale and on 1 January 1918, the two tramway systems were finally joined at a cost of £35,000 (equivalent to £ in ).

Fleet

Southport Corporation fleet eventually reached 45 vehicles.
1-12, 14, 16, 18, Electric Railway and Tramway Carriage Works 1900
13, 15, 17, 20, 22, 24, 26, 28, 30, 32, 34, Electric Railway and Tramway Carriage Works 1901
21 United Electric Car Company 1914
23, 25, 27 United Electric Car Company 1915

From Southport Tramways Company the Corporation acquired the following
1, 3, 5, 7, 9, 11, 13, 15, 17, 19, 35-44 Brush Electrical Machines 1918
29, 31, 33 English Electric 1919

Closure

The system closed on 31 December 1934.

See also

Southport Pier Tramway
Southport power station

External links
 Rare 1902 film view of a trip on Southport tram

References

Tram transport in England
Southport
Historic transport in Lancashire
Historic transport in Merseyside